Alix Marie (born 1989) is a French artist who works with photography and sculpture, based in London. In 2019 she received the Royal Photographic Society's Vic Odden Award.

Life and work
Marie was born in Paris. She studied for a Bachelor of Fine Arts at Central Saint Martins, London from 2008 to 2011 and a Master of Fine Arts Photography at the Royal College of Art, London from 2012 to 2014.

She was a two-week long Speed Resident at the Victoria and Albert Museum, London in 2014.

Publications

Publications by Marie
Bleu. UK: Môrel, 2017. . Edition of 300 copies.

Publications with contributions by Marie
Science and Fiction. London: Black Dog, 2014. RCA photography collective.
MDAM. Joint publication with Mia Dudek. UK: Plantation Journal, 2017.
Unique: Making Photographs in the Age of Ubiquity. Katherine Oktober Matthews. Netherlands: House Of Oktober, 2018.
BodyFiction. Austria: European Month of Photography, 2019.
Body. Nathalie Herschdorfer. London: Thames & Hudson, 2019.
Photography Now: Fifty Pioneers Defining Photography for the Twenty-First Century. By Charlotte Jansen. London: Tate; Octopus, 2021. ISBN 9781781576205.

Exhibitions
Styx, National Center for Photography, Ballarat, 2021 
Sucer La Nuit, Musée Des Beaux Arts Le Locle, 2019
Shredded, Roman Road, London, 2019

Awards
2017: Winner, Portfolio Review Award, Duesseldorf Photo Weekend, Düsseldorf, Germany
2019: Vic Odden Award, Royal Photographic Society, Bristol

References

External links

French photographers
French women photographers
21st-century French photographers
Artists from Paris
Alumni of the Royal College of Art
Alumni of Central Saint Martins
Place of birth missing (living people)
Living people
1989 births
21st-century women photographers
21st-century French women